Ivete Sangalo is the first solo album of Brazilian singer Ivete Sangalo, released in 1999.

On the disc, Ivete, fresh out of Banda Eva, invested in various rhythms: Maracatu, Reggae, Forro and romantic music are present on the album, besides, of course, the Axe Music. The first singles from the album were "Canibal" and "Tá Tudo Bem", performed at concerts prior to burning the CD.

The album became a bestseller especially in 2000, when the romantic song "Se Eu Não Te Amasse Tanto Assim", composed by Herbert Vianna and Paulo Sérgio Valle, was included in the soundtrack of the telenovela Uga Uga, Rede Globo, making the most played song 2000.

Also noteworthy are the tracks "100 o seu Amor" (rewriting Luiz Caldas and Carlinhos Brown), "Medo de Amar" (featuring Ed Motta and arrangements musician César Camargo Mariano), "Tenho Dito" (John composition Anja Bosco and Blanc), "Sá Marina" (success of Antonio Adolfo Gaspar and Tiberius) and "Bota Pra Ferver" (remake the banda Asa de Águia).

Critical reception 
In general, the album received positive reviews.

In criticism of Allmusic, for example, the songs "Canibal", "100 o seu Amor", "Eternamente" and "Sá Marina" were taken as the best album.

Track listing

Certifications

References 

1999 debut albums
Ivete Sangalo albums
Mercury Records albums
Universal Music Brazil albums